In computer software testing, a test assertion is an expression which encapsulates some testable logic specified about a target under test. The expression is formally presented as an assertion, along with some form of identifier, to help testers and engineers ensure that tests of the target relate properly and clearly to the corresponding specified statements about the target. 
Usually the logic for each test assertion is limited to one single aspect specified. A test assertion may include prerequisites which must be true for the test assertion to be valid.

See also 
 Test driven
Conformance testing

References

 Green, Stephen D. (Editor) et al. (2012) "Test Assertions Guidelines Committee Note 1.0" OASIS-open.org
 Durand, Jacques et al. (2009) "Test Assertions on steroids for XML artifacts." In Proceedings of Balisage: The Markup Conference 2009. Balisage Series on Markup Technologies, vol. 3 (2009)

External links
 , W3C 'Test Assertion Guide' (Editor's Draft)
 , Unisoft's 'Glossary of Testing Terms' includes a definition for 'test assertion'
 , OASIS-open.org has a technical committee producing open, royalty-free specifications for a test assertions model and markup language

Software testing